A warranty is a guarantee or promise that specific facts or conditions are true or will happen.

Warranty may also refer to:

 Collateral warranty, gives a third party rights in an existing contract
 Extended warranty, a goods/service maintenance agreement
 Home warranty, home appliance service maintenance agreement
 Implied warranty, presumed assurances made in the sale of products or real property
 Industry Loss Warranties, insurance protection against an event to an entire insurance
 Warranty deed, real estate deed giving assurance of clear title and right to sell
 Warranty tolling, extending a product warranty period

See also
 Warrant (disambiguation)